Onye Nnorom is a Canadian physician and public health specialist. She is an Assistant Professor and Associate Program Director of the Public Health and Preventative Medicine Residency Program at the Dalla Lana School of Public Health. She is the Black Health Lead for University of Toronto's Faculty of Medicine, and is a former President of the Black Physicians’ Association of Ontario. Her research considers public health and health inequality for Black and other marginalized communities.

Early life and education 
Nnorom was born in Montreal, Quebec. Her mother migrated to Canada from Trinidad and Tobago and her father migrated from Nigeria. Her father worked as a maintenance worker and her mother was a personal support worker. Nnorom took part in a summer camp for gifted students, during which she became interested in science.

Nnorom attended Concordia University where she completed a bachelor's degree in Molecular Biology. In the second year of her degree she was mentored by a physician, Dr. Eric Laryea, who was leading a program to recruit more Black medical students. Nnorom eventually applied to study medicine at McGill University, where she focused on the social determinants of health, graduating in 2007. During her time at McGill she volunteered with the YMCA, helping refugees access health services. She completed a Master's degree in Public Health at the University of Toronto and completed her residency training at St. Michael's Hospital.

Research and career 
Upon graduating, Nnorom worked in various community health programs around Thunder Bay and Toronto, including the Women’s Health in Women’s Hands Community Health Centre and NorWest Community Health Centre. She then joined the TAIBU Community Health Centre as a Family Physician & Chronic Disease Prevention Lead. She also works as a Clinical Consultant for the Nicotine Dependence Centre at the Centre for Addiction and Mental Health.

In 2013, she was made Associate Program Director at the Dalla Lana School of Public Health for the Public Health and Preventative Medicine Residency Program. Her research considers anti-Black racism and how it impacts health outcomes. She has worked with the University of Toronto to incorporate discussions on structural racism and public health into all four years of their medical school education. In 2020, Nnorom was appointed Director of Equity, Diversity and Inclusion in the Department of Family and Community Medicine at the University of Toronto.

In 2020, Nnorom launched a podcast, Race, Health & Happiness, which discusses the impact of institutional racism on societal health. She is a former President of the Black Physicians’ Association of Ontario. In 2021, under Nnorom's leadership and in partnership with the Black Scientists’ Task Force on Vaccine Equity in Toronto, the Black Physicians' Association of Ontario launched the Black Health Vaccine Initiative, an effort aimed at providing culturally safe vaccine clinics to Black and other marginalized communities across the province.

In 2021, alongside fellow Black Canadian physicians, Nnorom cofounded and launched the Black Health Education Collaborative (BHEC), a project which has been in the works since 2019. The Collaborative is an education primer with several modules aimed at medical students and medical school faculties to provide information and resources on Black health and inequities in the Canadian healthcare system. Other healthcare professionals involved in the Collaborative include Dr. OmiSoore Dryden, Dr. Delia Douglas, Sume Ndumbe-Eyoh, Dr. Barbara Hamilton-Hinch, and Dr. Gaynor Watson-Creed.

Awards and honours 
 2019 Honouree, Women of Purpose Awards
 2020 Best Health Magazine's Women of the Year

Selected publications

References 

1981 births
Living people
Concordia University alumni
Physicians from Montreal
African-American physicians
Canadian women physicians